Nakuru is a city in the Rift Valley region of the republic of Kenya. It is the capital of Nakuru County, and was formerly the capital of Rift Valley Province. As of 2019, Nakuru had an urban and rural population of 570,674 inhabitants, making it the largest urban center in the Rift Valley, with Eldoret in Uasin Gishu County following closely behind. The city lies along the Nairobi Nakuru Highway, a distance of 160 kilometers from Nairobi, the capital of Kenya. It is the third largest city and fourth largest urban center by metropolitan area in Kenya, behind Nairobi, Mombasa and Kisumu respectively. It lies about 1,850 m above sea level.

History 

Archaeological discoveries located about 8 km from the Central Business District at the Hyrax Hill reserve have been dated to the prehistoric period.

The city was created on January 28, 1904 when an area within a circle having a radius of one mile from the main entrance to the railway station was proclaimed to be a township. The name of the town was derived from the Maasai-speaking people of Kenya.

During the colonial era, the British established Nakuru as part of the White highlands during the colonial era, and Nakuru became a municipality in 1952.

Following the founding of the Republic of Kenya the first and second presidents of Kenya, Jomo Kenyatta and Daniel Arap Moi, had their semi-official residences within the city. The city for a long time has been a hotbed of Kenyan politics and has been a home to politicians such as the late Kariuki Chotara, Kihika Kimani, the late Mirugi Kariuki and Koigi Wamwere.

During the 2007 post-election violence dozens of buildings in Nakuru were burnt to the ground.

On 3 June 2021, Nakuru was officially endorsed for city status after the Kenyan Senate voted for its elevation from a municipality. Following the approval of the Senate of Kenya in June, the President of the Republic of Kenya gave a city charter for official transformation of Nakuru to a city status in December 1, 2021, making it the fourth urban center in Kenya to be declared a city after Nairobi, Mombasa and Kisumu.

Geography 

The city of Nakuru is situated in Nakuru County, Kenya. It lies 1850 meters above sea level.

Climate 
Nakuru has a temperate climate throughout the year but temperatures fall significantly at night and during the cold season of June to August. The city has a Subtropical highland climate (Köppen climate classification Csb).

Gardens 
The Nyayo gardens are located along Kenyatta Avenue in Nakuru.

Economy 

Agriculture, manufacturing and tourism are the main parts of the economy of Nakuru. The area surrounding the city is known for its agricultural uses, with numerous small farms and agricultural enterprises. The main crops grown around Nakuru include coffee, wheat, barley, maize, beans and potatoes. These crops are stored in massive silos at the outskirts of the city by the National Cereals and Produce Board and Lesiolo Grain Handlers Limited. The crops provide the primary raw material for the manufacturing industries found in Nakuru and Nairobi, such as flour milling and grain ginneries. Dairy farming is a key economic activity in Nakuru and provides the inputs for various milk processing plants around the city.

Other manufacturing industries located in Nakuru include the Menengai soap factory, Car and General motorcycle plant, Eveready battery plant, Fertiplant East Africa, and many more.

Nakuru is one of Kenya's largest retail supermarket chains. The Nakumatt, Naivas, Tuskys, and Gilanis supermarkets were all founded in Nakuru.

According to a UN study released in 2011, Nakuru is Africa's fastest-growing city and the fourth fastest in the world.

The city is also a centre for various retail businesses that provide goods and services to the manufacturing and agricultural sectors. A large public market lies to the west of the town on the main thoroughfare to the capital, Nairobi.

Human resources

Education 

Nakuru is an important educational centre. It is the home of Egerton University, a large public university, and Kabarak University, a private university associated with former President Moi's business and religious interests. Mount Kenya University, University of Nairobi and Kenyatta University also have campuses here.

Nakuru is also a home to numerous public and private secondary schools. Public schools include Nakuru Boys High School and Nakuru Girls High School, formerly Nakuru High School, Menengai High School, and Nakuru day secondary school.
There is a public library run by the Kenya National Library Service.

Public health 
The Nakuru hospital is one of the largest in the county, previously the biggest in Rift Valley province. It is also home to the Nakuru War Memorial Hospital opened shortly after World War I by Norman Jewell to commemorate troops.

Public safety

Police and law enforcement 

Nakuru has a fire fighting service that works around the clock. They can be accessed by dialing 911 service. The number can also be used in case of any other emergency.

Transportation

Air 
Nakuru is home to the Lanet Airstrip that was approved in 2017 for upgrade to an international airport by the Ministry of Transport and the county government.

Road 
Dondori road C86 linking the city to central Kenya. The Eldoret-Nairobi highway passes through this city linking Uasin Gishu County with the capital Nairobi.

Rail 
The Rift Valley Railways narrow gauge track runs through the city with a railway station located on the edge of the CBD. it connects to cities of Nairobi and Mombasa to the east and Kisumu and Eldoret to the west.

The government is currently extending the newer standard gauge railway from Nairobi to Nakuru and further on to Kisumu with a brand new station planned for the city. The railway line is expected to reach neighboring town Naivasha by June 2019.

Tourism 

Two kilometers north of the town of Nakuru is Lake Nakuru, one of the Rift Valley soda lakes, which forms part of the Lake Nakuru National Park. The park was declared a rhino sanctuary in 1983. The park was declared a Ramsar site in 1990 and as an Important Bird Area in 2009. The park is internationally known for its dense flamingo population. It is an important feeding site for great white pelicans that nest in nearby Lake Elmenteita. The park is home to over 450 species of birds and 56 mammal species, including Rothchild's giraffes.

Apart from the animals, numerous other sites of interest are accessible from Nakuru. These include Menengai Crater, a dormant volcano. Small fumaroles and steam vents can regularly be observed within the forested caldera from above. The second largest surviving volcanic crater in the world, it plunges 483 meters down from the rim and the summit is accessible by foot or vehicle 8 km from the main road to Nyahururu. The wood-covered crater ground is a nature reserve.

Although Lake Bogoria and Lake Baringo are in Baringo County, they are easily accessible from Nakuru. These are major tourist attraction sites, too.

The Hyrax Hill prehistoric site, discovered by the Leakeys in 1926, is considered a major Neolithic and Iron Age site. The adjoining museum features findings from various nearby excavations.

Culture and contemporary life

Cuisine 

The food culture of Nakuru includes a variety of local and international cuisines.

Sports 
Afraha Stadium is a multi-purpose stadium in Nakuru, Kenya. It is mainly used for football matches, and it is the home stadium of Nakuru AllStars of the Kenyan Premier League and Ulinzi Stars of the Kenyan Premier League. The stadium can hold 8,200 people and opened in 1948. The stadium is two kilometres from the famous Lake Nakuru National Park. Even though it is a football stadium, it became famous for hosting many political meetings including the GEMA promoted change the constitution series held in the 1970s. The former ruling party KANU also held many prominent meetings there during the Moi era.

Nakuru has local skaters that are easily notable in the Maasai market area on weekends. The Maasai market also has skateboarders.

The Rift Valley Sports Club lies in the centre of the city. The club was started in 1907 by white European settlers who had settled in Nakuru in the early 1900s. A number of sporting activities are hosted at this club and one sport that is popular among them is cricket. The local Indian community can be found at cricket fixtures throughout the year.

The city hosts an annual rugby festival,  "The Great Rift 10-a-side", featuring teams from across the East Africa region. It is held at the Nakuru Athletics Club. Nakuru is one of six cities to host a leg of the national rugby sevens circuit. Nakuru's leg is referred to as the "prinsloo sevens". It has contributed to one of Nakuru's nicknames, Nax Vegas.

A motor racing track, Nakuru Park, (not to be confused with the Langa Langa circuit near Gilgil) operated in the Lake View Estate area from 1956 until the mid 1980s.

People 

Nakuru is populated by people from many regions of the world. The population is predominantly composed of Kikuyu people and Kalenjin people. The city has a sizable population of Kenyans of Indian origin and a few of the original settler families have also remained in the area. According to the 2019 Kenya Population Census, Nakuru had the third-largest urban population in Kenya.

Surrounding towns include Lanet, which lies approximately 10 km from Nakuru, predominantly a residential town and home to the Moi Forces Academy and an army base. Njoro lies 20 km from Nakuru and is a small agricultural town with a local university aimed at promoting agricultural development in Kenya, namely Egerton University (est. 1934).

Nakuru is now the headquarters of the newly created Nakuru county in the Counties of Kenya. The current governor is Susan Kihika and the Member of Parliament for the town is David Gikaria. The senator for Nakuru is Tabitha Karanja.

Sister cities 
 Nakuru is a sister city of:

See also 

 Roman Catholic Diocese of Nakuru
 Railway stations in Kenya
 Nakuru County
 Lake Nakuru National Park
 Menengai Forest

References

Bibliography
  (Includes articles about Nakuru)

External links

 Nakuru Kenya
 Nakuru
 Nakuru Kenya
 Nakuru Municipal Council
 Nakuru online
 Hivisasa Nakuru County News

 
Populated places in Nakuru County
Provincial capitals in Kenya
County capitals in Kenya